This is a list of alien races that appear in Marvel Comics.

Overview
There are countless different extraterrestrial races in Marvel Comics universe. The vast majority are humanoid in structure.

Galactic Council
The Galactic Council is the assembly of numerous leaders of different alien empires across the universe created to deal with different matters of the universe.

Current members
 Kl'rt, Galactic Ambassador Paibok (Kree/Skrull Alliance)
 Oracle-2, Izzy Kane (Shi'ar Empire)
 Noh-Varr (Utopian Kree)
 Richard Rider (Earth, Nova Corps)
 Empress Victoria, Peter Quill (Spartax)
 Mentacle (Rigellians)
 Nymbis Sternhoof (Kymellians)
 Riitho (Intergalactic Empire of Wakanda)
 Zoralis Gupa, Orbis Stellaris (Galactic Rim Collective)
 Lani Ko Ako (Badoon Sisterhood)
 Peacebringer (Chitauri Empire)
 Empress Kuga (Zn'rx Empire)

Former Members
 All-Mother Freyja (Asgard)
 Y-Gaaar (Brotherhood of the Badoon)
 Supreme Intelligence, Ronan the Accuser (Kree Empire)
 Young Annihilus (Negative Zone)
 Alberik (Axi-Tun)
 Majestor (Shi'ar Empire)
 Manat (Badoon)
 Brood Queen (Brood)
 Inhuman Royal Family: Gorgon, Medusa, Crystal, Karnak (Kree Empire, Attilan)
 Kronaster Sintariis (Ruul, Kree Empire)
 Captain Val-Lorr (Kree/Skrull Alliance)
 Bartos (Krylorians)
 Fayrelyte Strongheart (Kymellians)
 King Blastaar (Negative Zone)
 King Groot (Planet X)
 Nelet Pa (Rigellians)
 Lilandra (Shi'ar Empire) (Former Leader)
 Kreddik (Skrull Empire)
 Dibdeb (Sneepers)
 Basaltar (Stonians)
 Wibbow (Wobbow)
 Emperor J'son (Spartax)
 Emperor Stote (Zn'rx)
 Peacemaker (Chitauri)

In other media
The Galactic Council appears in animated series Guardians of the Galaxy. Members of this iteration includes:-
 J'son (Spartax)
 Thor (Asgard)
 Nova Prime Irani Rael (Nova Corps)
 Rigellian Grand Commissioner (Rigellians)
 Supreme Intelligence (Kree Empire)

Major races
A few alien races have had considerable "air time" in various Marvel Comics publications over the years, having a near-constant presence and/or major crossovers and storylines involving them. This includes:

Badoon

The Badoon (first seen in Silver Surfer #2) are a race of reptilian aliens that are notable for living under strict gender segregation, resulting in two separate societies: the Brotherhood of Badoon (ruled by a "Brother Royal") and the Sisterhood of Badoon (ruled by a Queen).

Beyonders

The Beyonders (first mentioned in Marvel Two-in-One #63) are an enigmatic and virtually omnipotent extra-dimensional race of entities powerful enough to collect planets. They are unable to leave their own dimension and have never been observed by any being of the Earth dimension and to interact with the Earth dimension they must operate through agents. The most notable member of the Beyonders is the Beyonder.

Brood

The Brood (first seen in The Uncanny X-Men #155) are a race of insectoid, parasitic, extraterrestrial beings.

Celestials

The Celestials (first seen in The Eternals #1) have existed since near the birth of the universe.

Chitauri

The Chitauri (first seen in The Ultimates #8) are a race of aliens similar to the Skrulls in Ultimate Marvel. They have since been established in the main Marvel Universe.

Cotati

The Cotati (first seen in The Avengers #133) are a race of highly intelligent species of telepathic plants. The Cotati originated on Hala in the Pama star system in the Large Magellanic Cloud, the same planet as the warlike humanoid Kree race.

Dire Wraiths

The Dire Wraiths (first seen in Rom the Spaceknight #1) are an evolutionary offshoot of the Skrulls from the Andromeda Galaxy. Like the Skrulls, the Wraiths are shapeshifters where they are able to take the forms of other creatures and duplicate their natural (non-magical/super) abilities.

Kree

The Kree (first seen in Fantastic Four #65) are a scientifically and technologically advanced militaristic alien race that are native to the planet Hala in the Large Magellanic Cloud. They were the rivals of the Skrulls.

Phalanx

The Phalanx (first seen in The Uncanny X-Men #305) are a cybernetic species that form a hive-mind linking each member by a telepathy-like system.

Shi'ar

The Shi'ar (first seen in X-Men #97) reside in The Shi'ar Empire (or Imperium). The Shi'ar are alien humanoids of avian descent that have feathered crests on top of their heads instead of hair. The Shi'ar's empire is a vast collection of alien species, cultures, and worlds situated close to the Skrull and Kree Empires. The Shi'ar are also called the Aerie.

Skrull

The Skrulls (first seen in Fantastic Four #2) are a race of shapeshifting aliens that originated from the planet Skrullos. They were the rivals of the Kree.

 The Skrulls have made numerous appearances in animated television and video games and in Marvel Cinematic Universe, the films Captain Marvel and Spider-Man: Far From Home and the series WandaVision.

Symbiotes

The Symbiotes (first seen in Secret Wars #8) are a race of amorphous extraterrestrial parasites that envelop their hosts like costumes, creating a symbiotic bond through which the host's mind can be influenced. They are also known as the Klyntar.

 The Symbiotes have appeared in various media adaptations, television series and video games, including live-action films Spider-Man 3, Venom and Venom: Let There Be Carnage.

Watchers

The Watchers (first seen, in the form of Uatu, in Fantastic Four #13) are the first humanoid race to be created in the Marvel Universe and are committed to observing and compiling knowledge on all aspects of the universe who possess the innate ability to achieve virtually any effect desired, including augmenting personal attributes, time and space manipulation, molecular manipulation, energy projection, and a range of mental powers. After an incident with the Prosilicans, the Watchers then took a vow never to interfere with other civilizations. The best known Watcher is Uatu.

Secondary races
Scores of other extraterrestrial races have been depicted in the pages of Marvel Comics publications, though not to the extent of the races mentioned above. This list is not comprehensive.

A

A'askvarii
First appearing in Black Goliath, the A'askvarii are a green-skinned humanoid race with octopus traits, possessing two legs (ending in three-toed taloned feet) and three tentacles sprouting from each shoulder in place of arms. They possess gills in place of a nose, and closely spaced needle-like teeth. They possess fairly advanced technology, with warp-drive capability. A'askvarii are native to the planet O'erlanii; it is an oceanic world with oceans covering 75% of the planet's surface, and the rest being craggy mountains.

A-Chiltarians
First appearing in Tales to Astonish, the A-Chiltarians are a humanoid race possessing many eyes and purple-grey fur over their entire bodies, with four-fingered hands and three-toed feet. They possess a tribal culture, and are mildly aggressive and temperamental. They are native to A-Chiltar III, a marshy planet (60% marsh, 40% prairie), and the atmosphere has a high methane content.

Aakon
First appeared in Captain Marvel, the Aakon are a race of yellow-skinned, dark-haired humanoids, the Aakon are enemies of the Kree and are allied with the Shadow Consortium. They have an Intergalactic Council and sought the destruction of all human life due to the perceived universal threat of Earth's population of super-beings. A number of Aakon colonies have since been destroyed by the Annihilation Wave.

Acanti

The Acanti are a race of space creatures that resemble whales.

Archernonians
First appearing in Thor, the Achernonians are a purple-skinned humanoid race native to the planet Achernon. Achernonians are a tall race, averaging 6'4" tall, and possess only a pre-Industrial level of technology. They are depicted as superstitious, with a dictatorial government. Some possess the ability to become immaterial at will. The planet Achernon is a rocky world, 60% covered in volcanic rock; the atmosphere possesses a high sulfur content.

Aedians
First appearing in Silver Surfer, the Aedians possess telepathic powers; they can sense the presence of others within their planet's orbit. They are also empathic, able to sense the pain or emotions of others. They can project their astral selves, even into orbit. They are thin humanoid bipeds, with an elongated cranium and no noses.

Agullo
The Agullo are an alien race that was diminished from over 60,000,000 to a few thousands after Thanos came to their planet Ahl-Agullo.

Alpha Centaurians
First appearing in Sub-Mariner, the Alpha Centaurians are a humanoid race with fine grey scales and other adaptations (gills, webbed toes) that enable them to live underwater. Their government is a feudal one, organized into several small, independent kingdoms; their culture tends to be self-centered and dispassionate. They are native to Arima, which has water covering 95% of its surface, and its gravity and atmospheric thickness are both approximately twice that of Earth. They possess spacecraft capable of 85% lightspeed.

Amebids
The Amebids are a race of jellyfish-like aliens that come from the planet Sakaar. Amebids can inflate their bodies with noxious gases that they produce enabling them to float like balloons. They first appeared in The Incredible Hulk (vol. 2) #92.

Annunaki
The Annunaki are an alien race that helped Silver Surfer gather and protect some of Earth's most extraordinary gifted children.

Archeopians
The Archeopians are from the planet Archeopia. Most of the race was killed when the incubator cube of Galactus was opened and he consumed Archeopia. The small fleet which escaped has since sailed the galaxy for uncounted centuries with other aliens who lost their planets to Galactus called The Wanderers. First seen in Thor #160 (January 1969).fyou

Arcturans
First appearing in Fear. the Arcturans are a humanoid race with pink-white skin, approximately half their populations are mutants due to a combination of biochemical advancements. They are native to Arcturus IV. Their technology level is comparable to Earth's. In the 31st century, two of the best-known Arcturans are Starhawk and Aleta, members of the Guardians of the Galaxy.

Aris
The Aris are an alien race that comes from the planet Ariston. First appeared in Marvel Comics Presents #49.

Arthrosians
The Arthrosian are a race of insectoids that come from the planet Anthros in the Negative Zone. Annihilus is an Arthrosian. First appeared in Fantastic Four Annual #6.

Aspirants
The Aspirants are a race of celestial beings that were the result of the First Firmament's loneliness.

Astrans
First appearing in The Incredible Hulk, the Astrans are a humanoid race with yellow skin and toe-less, flat feet, no hair, four lungs, and special glands in the stomach. They have the ability to control metal like Magneto and three-quarters of the population are either priests or artists. They are native to Astra, where 50% of the planet surface is metallic ore, and the remained is split evenly between water and soil.

Astrans in other media
The Astrans appear in the Marvel Cinematic Universe television series Agents of S.H.I.E.L.D. Known Astrans are Crixon (portrayed by Gabriel Hogan) and Montalban (portrayed by Louie Ski Carr). The Astrians are part of the Confederacy. Crixon served as the ambassador to the Confederacy until he was absorbed into the Gravitonium by Glenn Talbot as seen in the episode "The One Who Will Save Us All". Montalban worked for Mister Kitson as his enforcer at the House of Games as seen in "Fear and Loathing on the Planet Kitson" and "Toldja".

Ataraxians
The Ataraxians are a race of aliens from the planet Ataraxia in the Negative Zone. First appeared in Annihilation: Super-Skrull #2.

Autocrons
First appearing in Machine Man, the Autocrons are a humanoid race with blue-black skin, two-toed feet, and an average height of 6'5". Their bodies are iron-based rather than carbon-based, and they possess superhuman strength and durability. Their government is ruled by a world-computer (and their level of technology is more than Earth's); their culture is imperialistic, militaristic, and orderly. They are native to Cron, which possess a gravity and atmospheric density almost three times greater than Earth's, and the atmosphere has a high methane content. Cron is rich in metallic ores and only has 4% surface water; mechanized cities cover 85% of the planet.

Axi-Tun
First appearing in Fantastic Four, the Axi-Tun are a humanoid race that appears much like tall humans, with an average height of 6'4". They live on the planet Tun. Axi-Tun have energy-manipulating powers. Axi-Tun have a level of technology superior to Earth's, with the capability of faster than light travel. Four Axi-Tun explorers crash-landed on Earth during World War II, and a Nazi scientist named Werner Schmidt named them after Teutonic gods. These Axi-Tun battled the Invaders but committed suicide to keep their technology from falling into human hands. Many years later, four Axi-Tun warriors calling themselves "The Four Horsemen of the Apocalypse" attacked Earth but were defeated by the Fantastic Four.

B

Ba-Bani
First appeared in Avengers, the Ba-Bani are a humanoid race with yellow skin and orange or yellow hair. They are governed by local military dictatorships, tend to be warlike and engaging in a planet-wide war. They are native to the planet Ba-Banis, an Earth-like world which orbits the star they call Ba.

Baluurians
First appearing in Fantastic Four, the Baluurians are a humanoid race, stronger and tougher than humans. Baluurians are native to the Negative Zone, where they have established an empire. Blastaar and Burstaar are Baluurians.

Betans
First appeared in Godzilla, the Betans humanoid race with light purple skin, two-toed feet, and wings which enable them to fly in low-gravity environments. They live on the planet Beta. Their technology is superior to that of Earth and they are capable of faster than light travel. The people of Beta were engaged in centuries in a war with the neighboring planet Megan.

Bidoceros
First appearing in The Incredible Hulk, the Bidoceros have flat bodies with a tube-like vocal protuberance.

Biphasians
The Biphasians are a race of aliens from the planet Biphasia.

Birjans
The Birjans are a humanoid rock-skinned race from Birj sixth moon of the planet Marman, a gas-giant that is the seventh planet from its sun. Terrax is a Birjan. The Birjan are also called Landlaks. First seen in Fantastic Four #211 (October 1979).

Blips
The Blips are a race of giant electrical aliens. Blip is part of this race.

Builders
First mentioned in Avengers, the Builders are one of the oldest races in the universe and go about building and creating worlds as they see fit, a claim also attributed to the Celestials. Any connection between the two races remains unknown. They are the creators of the Superflow which facilitates White Events. There are two types of Builders: the Creators and the Engineers.

C

Calurnians
The Calurnians are a race of aliens with cat-like features. First appeared in Rom Annual #4.

Carmondians
The Carmondians are an alien race with a variety of appearances. First appeared in Captain Marvel (vol. 3) #4.

Centaurians
As shown in that issue, some demonstrate "psionic" abilities. They are a primitive tribal race, using bows and arrows in hunting. Centaurians are native to Centauri IV. Yondu of the Guardians of the Galaxy is a Centaurian as well as the Earth-616 version that leads the Ravagers.

Centurii
First appearing in Thor, the Centurii are a humanoid race with light yellow skin and a culture composed largely of philosophers and artists. The Centurii are native to Centuri-Six, an Earth-like world. The Centurii have a worldwide democracy, and their level of technology is comparable to Earth's. There are few Centurii on their planet.

Chnitt
The Chnitt are a race of semi-spider aliens. First appeared in The Uncanny X-Men #358.

Chronomonitors
The Chronomonitors are a race of sentient robotic organisms artificially-created by the Time Variance Authority (TVA) using "quantum technology" to fill its lower ranks. The moment a new reality appears, a new faceless agent is created to monitor it, along with the necessary equipment (a personal computer-like device, plus a desk and a chair) to do so.

Chronomonitors in other media
A race of aliens based on the Chronomonitors called Chronicoms appeared in the Marvel Cinematic Universe (MCU) television series Agents of S.H.I.E.L.D.. Each of the Chronicoms are sorted by their roles of predictor, hunter, and anthropologist. Known Chronicoms include the anthropologists Enoch (portrayed by Joel Stoffer), Noah (portrayed by Joel David Moore) and Isaiah (portrayed by Jan Uddin), hunters Atarah (portrayed by Sherri Saum), Malachi (portrayed by Christopher James Baker), Baal-Gad (portrayed by Christian Ochoa), and Luke (portrayed by Luke Baines), and predictor Sibyl (portrayed by Tamara Taylor). Introduced at the end of the fourth season with Enoch bringing the title characters to the future to attempt to help them escape a time loop and prevent the past destruction of Earth in the fifth season. Their leading faction was additionally featured as the main antagonists for the seventh season of the series after sporadically featuring throughout the sixth season in a minor role as they seek to make Earth their next planet after their homeworld Chronyca-2 was destroyed by Izel and the Shrike.

Chr'Ylites
First appearing in Uncanny X-Men, the Chr'Ylites are a technomechanical insectoid race, averaging 1'6" in length, possessing two red eyes, and transparent insectile wings on top of their bodies, making them resemble a cross between a dragonfly and a helicopter. They are a telempathic species who make for highly exceptional healers & diplomats. They are native to the planet Chr'Yllalisa. The Starjammers' medic Sikorsky is a Chr'Ylite.

Ciegrimites
First appearing in Hercules, the Ciegrimites are a green-skinned hairless humanoid race with snail-like traits, Ciegrimites average 4' in height, have snail-like shells around their trunks, and their eyes are on raised stalks. Their technology is incredibly advanced in the area of alcoholic beverage distillation; their homeworld, Ciegrim-7, is known as "the Distiller's Planet."

Clavians
First appearing in Rom the Spaceknight, the Clavians are a humanoid race that appear similar to humans from Earth. They live on the planet Clarius, and are a tribal people, with technology inferior to Earth's. Dire Wraiths invaded Clarius, but were defeated by Rom.

Contraxians
First appeared in Jack of Hearts, the Contraxians are a humanoid race with pink or brown skin, who appear as humans except that the left sides of their bodies are darker-hued than the right sides. Contraxians live on the planet Contraxia. Two Contraxian women, going by the names Marcy Kane and Marie Hart, were sent to Earth disguised as humans to find a means to rekindle their sun's dying energies. Marie Hart was able to conceive a child with a human, who grew up to become the Jack of Hearts.

Courga
First appearing in Marvel Presents, the Courga are a race of humanoid dog-like aliens with brown skin, three fingers on each hand, two toes on each foot. Courga average 7'2" in height. They live on the planet Courg.

D

The D'Bari are a race of humanoid plant aliens who lost their planet when the Phoenix Force consumed their sun. They have been nicknamed the "Asparagus People" because of their asparagus-like appearance.

Dakkamites
First appearing in Silver Surfer, the Dakkamites are a humanoid race that appears mostly indistinguishable from humans. Dakkamites come from the planet Dakkam. Exposure to Earth's yellow sun grants them super-powers, as their cells have the ability to absorb and metabolize solar energy to fuel their abilities. Known Dakkamites include Wundarr the Aquarian and Quantum. They are indistinguishable from the DC Comics race, the Kryptonians and Daxamites.

Darbians
First appearing in Fantastic Four, the Darbians are a humanoid race that appears similarly to Earth humans, except that they average 8'10" in height. Their home planet is Darbia. They are able to generate and project concussive force.

Deonists
First appearing in Thor, the Deonists are a humanoid race with pale white skin and a slender build. Their homeworld, Deo was once the religious center of a confederation of planets and known as "Templeworld" but now called "the Doomsday Star" is 75% desert.

Dragon-Men
The Dragon-Men are a race of reptilian humanoids from the planet Ligra. They are often in conflict with the Lion-People.

Druffs
First appeared in Fantastic Four, the Druffs are timid creatures, averaging 3'6" in height and possessing pink skin covered by brown fur. They possess little more than childlike intelligence, and have the ability to reproduce by dividing into three identical beings whenever one is stuck with force. They have a lifespan of approximately three Earth-years, and are highly adaptable to most any environment. They originated on the world Ryas. They are considered to be vermin by the Skrulls, and are often slaughtered.

Druffs in other media
The Druffs appear in the Hulk and the Agents of S.M.A.S.H. episode "A Druff is Enough".

Duckworldians
The Duckworldians are a species of anthropomorphic ducks from Duckworld.

E

Elan
First appearing in Fantastic Four, the Elans semi-humanoid race, possessing green skin, two antennae atop their head, hoof-like feet, three fingers and an opposable thumb. Adult Elan 10' in height. They possess vast, virtually limitless psionic powers with which they can rearrange and transmute atoms and telekinetically manipulate objects. As a race, they are peaceful and tend not to associate with other aliens. The "Infant Terrible" is an infant member of the Elan race.

Entemen
First appearing in Marvel Presents, the Entemen are a humanoid race with octopus-like features, including tentacles in place of their arms and legs, and have yellow skin and average 6'6" in height. Their home planet is Entem.

Epsiloni
First appearing in Captain America, the Epsiloni are a humanoid race with pink-white skin, a fanged mouth, and toe-less spatulate feet. Epsiloni are parasites, draining life-force from other beings and gaining power from it. Their government was a fascist military dictatorship, and the Epsiloni were ruthless and regarded all other lifeforms as prey, very similar to Nazis and their methods.

Ergons
First appearing in Thor, the Ergons are a humanoid race with red skin, averaging 6'2" in height. They possess superhuman strength, an evolutionary adaptation to their homeworld's higher than normal gravity. Their culture is highly competitive, merciless, and adventurous. Their homeworld, Ergonar, has a gravity twice that of Earth's, is 50% covered in water (mostly ice) and the rest in mountains, and possesses a 90:10, oxygen:methane atmosphere.

Eridani
The Eridani are a race of alien humanoids that were supposed to handle the waste management for the Alpha Flight Space Program's Low-Orbit Space Station, but cancelled their services due to negotiation issues.

Ethereals
First appearing in Annihilation: Heralds of Galactus, the Ethereals are a non-humanoid race that are not composed of solid matter and believe that they are directly evolved from the elementary particles present when the universe was first created. The Ethereals do not normally interact with other races, referred to as "solids" or "corporeals", although the renegade Ethereal Stardust abandoned its race to serve Galactus. The race was almost exterminated by the Annihilation Wave. A handful of survivors escaped and confronted Stardust, who destroyed them and offered their essences as a gift to Galactus.

Exolon
The Exolon are a race of parasitic plasmoid creatures created by Knull, that fed on the immortal souls of living beings. Wraith is the most notable host of the Exolon.

Exolons in other media
The Exolons appears in the Marvel Cinematic Universe live-action film Guardians of the Galaxy, the Exolon Monks serve Ronan the Accuser as pilot of his ship Dark Aster.

Eyungs
The Eyungs are a race of aliens that were separated into three branches by the Celestials: the Eternals, Deviants, and the Latents.

F
Flarks
The Flarks are a race of face parasites where their names are often used as a type of intergalactic profanity.

Flb'Dbi
Flb'Dbi are telepathic and have lifespans of many thousands of Earth-years. They come from the planet Jhb'Btt. Half a million years ago, the Flb'Dbi had intermediate-level interstellar vessels; presumably today, they are far more advanced.

Flerken
The Flerken are alien creatures that resemble house cats. Unlike cats, however, they possess human-level intelligence and can lay eggs. Their mouths contain pocket dimensions used to store and hold almost anything; they can also teleport and summon tentacles with fanged maws from their mouths with which to attack and consume. Chewie is a Flerken.

Flora colossus
The Flora colossi colossi are a race of tree-like aliens from Planet X. Groot is a Flora colossus.

Flora colossus in other media
The Flora colossi appear in Guardians of the Galaxy. Most of the Flora colossi were exterminated by Ronan the Accuser.

Fomalhauti
First appearing in Thor, the Fomalhauti are a race of amoebic, amorphous blobs which average 2'5" in height, and are multi-cellular and can form tentacles to manipulate objects. They communicate telepathically. Fomalhauti come from the planet Pumor.

Fonabi
First appearing in Fantastic Four, the Fonabi are semi-humanoid race with light yellow skin that averages 16'5" in height with very squat, weak bodies.

Fortisquians
First appearing in Adventure into Fear, the Fortisquians are an alien race created by the Beyonders to spread life throughout the galaxy. Max is a Fortisquain.

Froma
First appearing in Tales of Suspense, the Froma are a humanoid race with green skin, averaging 7'6" in height, they are able to levitate psionically. The Froma are ruled by corporations. Their home planet is Chize. The Froma once attempted to attack Earth but were repulsed by Iron Man.

G
Galadorians
First appearing in Rom the Spaceknight, the Galadorians are a humanoid race that appears almost identical to humans, except that they average  in height. They come from the planet Galador. Rom is a Galadorian.

Gegku
First appearing in Hercules, the Gegku are a race of semi-reptilian humanoids with green scaled skin, two-toed feet, and average  in height. Their home planet is Wilamean. Although they have reptilian features, the gegku are actually mammalian; making them appear to look more cynodont-like in appearance instead.

Gigantians
The Gigantians are a race of humanoid aliens from the planet Gigantus. They were experimented upon by the Celestials.

Glx
The Glx are a race of semi-humanoid silicon-based creatures, the Glx have mostly humanoid bodies that average 8' tall, but they have yellow skin and their heads are shaped more like flat cylinders. Their home planet is called Glxx, third from the sun in the Zplst star system in the Milky Way galaxy. A Glx named Chleee was responsible for transforming a chain into an "energy synthicon" which linked the criminals Hammer and Anvil together and gave them superhuman powers. First seen in The Incredible Hulk (vol. 2) #182 (December 1974).

Grad Nan Holt
The Grad Nan Holt are an alien race that is the slave race to the Shi'ar. First appeared in X-Men: Legacy #253

Gramosians
The Gramosians are a humanoid race with blue-black skin that otherwise resembles humans physically, and are able to discharge energy through their hands. They come from the planet Gramos, third from the sun in the Sekar star system in the Milky Way galaxy. Years ago, the planet's magnetic polarity changed, admitting radiation from space which caused mass insanity and death until normalcy was restored by the debris of Xorr the God-Jewel. Mercurio the Fourth-Dimensional Man is a Gramosian. First seen in Thor #208 (February 1973).

Grosgumbeekians
The Grosgumbeekians are a quadrupedal alien race from the planet Grosgumbeek. They are highly adapted for great speed and can easily travel faster than the speed of sound (770 mph). By accessing tachyon tunnels, the Grosgumbeekians are not even constrained by the speed of light (186,000 miles/sec). They have no technology that has been seen. First seen in Quasar #47 (June 1993).

Grunds
The Grunds are a humanoid race that averages only  in height, Grunds have yellow skin and a pair of antennae atop their heads that absorb energy for concussive blasts. Their home planet is Grundar, fifth from the sun in the Quat star system in the Milky Way galaxy. The Grund named Grott the Man-Slayer was one of the agents of Korvac, the mad cyborg of 30th Century Earth. First seen in Giant-Size The Defenders #3 (January 1975).

Guna
Their hands and feet are adapted for digging. The Guna come from the planet Gunava, first from the sun in the Janoth star system in the Andromeda galaxy. They have a planetwide technocratic dictatorship, and their technology is advanced to the point of interstellar travel and vast solar energy converters. The Guna were in danger of extinction due to the dwindling of their sun. First seen in Tales of Suspense #55 (July 1964).

H
H'ylthri
The H'ylthri are an other-dimensional, sentient plant-like race. Their bodies are vegetable fiber with few vital organs, making them difficult to injure. They possess superhuman strength to an unspecified level, can control other plant life, and extend both tangling vines or poisonous barbs to knock mammals unconscious. They can grow humanoid doppelgangers with the originals' personality and memories. First seen in Iron Fist #2.

Halfworlders
The Halfworlders are a race of genetically engineered anthropomorphic animals that were created from Earth animals by an unnamed animal race on Halfworld. Rocket Raccoon is one of the Halfworlders.

Halfworlders in other media
The Halfworlders appear in Guardians of the Galaxy.

Herms
The Herms are a race of whale-like creatures with yellow-white skin that can absorb all manner of electromagnetic energy for strength and substance, which can also allow them to briefly transform into beings of pure energy; they can apparently travel through intergalactic space in energy form. Klaatu is a Herm. First seen in The Incredible Hulk (vol. 2) #136 (February 1971).

Hibers
The Hibers are a humanoid race with a similar appearance to Earth humans, except that they are all entirely hairless. Their home planet is Hiberlac, sixth from the sun in the Hunyoc star system in the Milky Way galaxy. They spend their entire lives in suspended animation, coming out only once every thousand years when the planet thaws. First seen in Rom #67 (June 1985).

Hodinns
The Hodinns are one of the many alien races that were integrated into the Shi'ar Empire. A race of sapient suns who're on the verge of dying out, there are two known Hodinn who served in the Shi'ar imperial guard. One known as G-Type who was supposedly killed by Xorn, while another was a convict recruited by Gabriel Summers into his Praetorian Imperial Guard then killed by the primary guardsmen when Havok drained his stellar energy. First appeared in New X-Men #124.

Hodomurians
The Hodomurians are an alien race. Century is a Hodomurian.

Honchi
The Honchi are a race of slug-like aliens.

Horde
The Horde are a species of cosmic insect-like beings that serve the Fulcrum (who gives the energy to the opposing forces), balancing the universe on the opposite side of the Celestials, whereas the Celestials are instruments of creation, the Horde are used as an instrument of destruction. While the Horde prefer to feed on infant worlds, they can also target Celestials due to the great energy flowing within them. Whenever a Celestial is infected, the powerful cosmic being either dies as its energy is consumed by the Horde or worse, mutates into a rabid creature known as a Dark Celestial. Every planet whose life was experimented by the Celestials, resulted in two races of opposite moralities. If the worse won over the better, the Horde were given that planet's life form's energy. If the better won over the worse, the Celestials were given energy to experiment more.

Horusians
They come from the planet Horus IV in the Horus star system in the Milky Way galaxy. Using machines, they can simulate psionic powers, and disguise themselves as the native gods of whatever planet they visit in order to inspire awe. When they visited Earth, they wore masks to make them resemble the gods of Heliopolis. First seen in The Incredible Hulk (vol. 2) #145 (November 1971).

Hujah
The Hujah live on the planet Huj, seventeenth from the sun in the Zuccone star system in the Milky Way galaxy. They have psychokinetic powers that compensate for their lack of arms. First seen in The Avengers Annual #7 (1977).

I
Inaku
First seen in Weapon H #8 (2018), the Inaku are a race of blue-skinned aliens that come from the planet of the same name. After something happened to their planet, the surviving Inaku stumbled blindly in the dark until they settled on Weirdworld and had put up a protective dome that kept their village safe from the Skrullduggers. The Inaku were also loyal to Witch Queen le Fay as her magic helped keep the Skrullduggers in line.

Interdites
The Interdites are a humanoid race with blue skin, they have developed precognition as well as other psionic powers. They come from the planet Interdis, seventh from the sun in the Tartaru star system in the Milky Way galaxy. Their civilization was demolished by the Badoon, and surviving Interdites have turned to mysticism and live like hermits scattered across the galaxy. First seen in Warlock #15 (November 1974).

Iron Knights
The Iron Knights are a humanoid race with red skin and dark hair, they have weapons, armor and technology that appears identical to that of European knights of the late Middle Ages. They are also immensely strong, so much so that even an adolescent boy can easily overpower the Hulk. The knights come from another dimension that the Hulk accessed through the Crossroads in The Incredible Hulk (vol. 2) #302. They share their world, which is called Paradise, with the Greens, a green-skinned humanoid race who are much weaker but have powerful magic, and with an orange skinned race of dwarves.

J
Jovians
There are two types of Jovians:

 The first Jovians are a race of werewolf-like aliens from the planet Jupiter.
 The second version of the Jovians are a race of aliens descended from a race of genetically engineered humans who live on the planet Jupiter. Charlie-27 is a Jovian. They first appeared in Marvel Super-Heroes #18 (January 1969).

Judans
Their home planet is Dyofor, second from the sun in the Palyn star system in the Milky Way galaxy. Judge Kray-Tor is a Judan. First seen in Strange Tales #180 (June 1975).

Jyn'ai
The Jyn'ai (also called Jynai, Jinni, and Genie) are a race of genie-like creatures that frequently manifest upon the material plane. They deal with specific humans using their powers to grant wishes. They have reality warping powers and can manipulate matter and energy, also can use some psionic powers like telepathy, clairvoyance and a kind of psychic erosion. Their human form was giant-like (7 ft). They have enhanced human agility, strength (1 ton range) and vast endurance. They can live for millennia. Although the jyn'ai are creatures from the astral plane they can assume human shape when they are on the material plane. The first appearance of the jyn'ai was in the Sleepwalker Holiday Special #1 (January, 1993) with a Sleepwalker's foe called Mister Jyn (Jinn is the Arabic word for genie).

K
K'aitians
The K'aitians are a humanoid race with green skin, for the most part identical to humans. They are a primitive people native to the planet K'ai in the microverse, and were ruled over by Jarella for a time. They first appeared in The Incredible Hulk (vol. 2) #140.

K'Lanti
The K'Lanti are a humanoid race with pale skin, featureless eyes and the ability to levitate. They dress regally, favoring long flowing robes and ornate chest-pieces. They were wracked with civil war, until the retrieval of an object called the Harmonium, which played music that they found greatly pleasing. Despite having gained the object which would restore peace, they still attempted to kill those, Lila Cheney and X-Factor, who ultimately retrieved it. First seen in X-Factor #111 (February 1995).

Kallusians
The Kallusians are a humanoid race with deep pink skin, with white or gray hair. Kallusians come from the planet Kallu, third from the sun in the Kallu-Kan star system in the Andromeda galaxy. The Avengers drove a group of Kallusians from their temporary refuge in Earth's Arctic for a distant section of the galaxy where they would again battle the aliens who first drove them from Kallu. First seen in The Avengers #14 (March 1965).

Kallusians in other media
 The Kallusians appear in the Guardians of the Galaxy episode "Jingle Bell Rock".
 The Kallusians appear in the Marvel Cinematic Universe television series Agents of S.H.I.E.L.D. The Kallusians are part of the Confederacy. Joqo (portrayed by Matthew Foster) served as an ambassador to the Confederacy as seen in "The One Who Will Save Us All".

Kamado
The Kamado are a humanoid race with an exaggeratedly muscular physique. Their home planet is Mikkaz, seventh from the sun in the Dopner star system in the Milky Way galaxy. In an alternate 20th Century, the Defenders, while investigating a UFO sighting, inadvertently caused the son of the Kamado king and his followers to commit suicide. In response, when the Kamado king found their remains four hundred years later, he ordered the annihilation of Earth. To prevent this occurrence from coming about, the original Defenders team disbanded. First seen in The Defenders #125 (November 1983).

Karidians
The Karidians are a race of aliens from the planet Karidia. Their planet was saved from their dying unstable sun by Silver Surfer. First appeared in Silver Surfer (vol. 3) #103.

Kawa
The Kawa are a reptilian semi-humanoid race with orange skin that averages  in height. They come from the planet Kawa in the Bawa Kawa star system in the Andromeda galaxy. After Galactus destroyed their planet, the Kawa began to worship him as their god and even lead him to sacrificial planets. First seen in Hercules #3 (November 1982).

Kigors
The Kigor are a race of crab-like aliens from Cancrius III. First appeared in Tales of Suspense #14.

Klangians
The Klangians are a race of humanoids from the planet Klang.

Klklk
The Klklk are an insectoid race covered with chitinous carapaces that averages  in length from head to end of tail. Their homeworld is La'kll, fourth from the sun in the Tl'blk star system in the Milky Way galaxy. They have antennae which can project disintegrating blasts. Klklk can exude thin but strong web-like filaments, and queens have demonstrated telepathy. First seen in The Incredible Hulk (vol. 2) #273 (July 1982).

Kodabaks
The Kodabaks are a humanoid pig-like race with two digits on each appendage, averaging  in height. They come from the planet Kodaba, seventh from the sun in the Grosgumbique star system in the Milky Way galaxy. Thanos recruited some Kodabaks to serve in his army, and they battled the Avengers aboard Sanctuary II. First seen in Marvel Two-In-One Annual #2 (1977).

Korbinites
The Korbinites are a humanoid race with light orange skin, averaging  in height, and originating in the so-called "Burning Galaxy". Beta Ray Bill is a Korbinite. However, Bill has been greatly genetically modified; normal Korbinites are bald and without noses and ears, while Bill has an equine face and pure-white eyes. First seen in Thor #337 (November 1983).

Korbinites in other media
 The Korbinites appear in animated series Avengers Assemble in the episode "New Frontiers".
 The Korbinites (including Beta Ray Bill) have been referenced throughout Marvel Cinematic Universe live-action films.

Kosmosians
The Kosmosians are a semi-reptilian race with similarities to multi-cellular amoeboids, with bodies that can "flow" as they move, thereby changing their length, which is 50' on average. Kosmosians come from the planet Kosmos, fifth from the sun in the Zokka star system, in the Milky Way galaxy. They have limited telepathic abilities which cause victims to be hypnotized into ceasing to live. Dr. Vernon van Dyne, father of Janet van Dyne once summoned a Kosmosian to Earth, which killed him. Hank Pym drove the creature away from Earth. First seen in Tales to Astonish #44 (June 1963).

Kronans
Their home planet is Ria, first from the sun in the Krona star system in the Milky Way galaxy. As revealed in WWH: Aftersmash: Warbound #4, Kronas do not reproduce they're produced by the planet and Kronans are in fact genderless. The most notable Kronan has been the Hulk's ally Korg. First seen (as the Stone Men from Saturn) in Journey into Mystery #83 (August 1962).

Kronans in other media
Kronans appear in Marvel Cinematic Universe live-action films Thor: The Dark World, Thor: Ragnarok, Thor: Love and Thunder,  and Guardians of the Galaxy Vol. 2. The film Thor: Love and Thunder featured the Kronan God Ninny the Nonnie (voiced by Taika Waititi).

Krozzar
The Krozzar are a race of scaly-skinned aliens.

Krylorians
The Krylorians are a semi-humanoid race from the planet Krylor, third from the sun in the Aceta star system in the Andromeda galaxy. Krylorians have an extremely high level of technology, with advanced interstellar ships powered and guided psionically. They are also advanced in molecular-scale manipulation, transmutation, and robotics. Bereet is a known Krylorian. First seen in The Incredible Hulk (vol. 2) #269 (March 1982).

The Krylorians appear in Marvel Cinematic Universe live-action film Guardians of the Galaxy.

Kt'kn
The Kt'kn are a semi-insectoid race with 2" spherical bodies with six spindly legs. They come from the planet Kn'kn, first from the sun in the Tk'kn star system in the Milky Way galaxy. They can communicate telepathically and have psionic senses rather than physical ones. The Faceless One is a member of this race. First seen in Astonishing Tales #2 (October 1970).

Kymellians

The Kymellians are a race of aliens that resemble humanoid horses. First seen in Power Pack #1 (August 1984).

L
Laxidazians
The Laxidazians are a humanoid race with pointed ears. They average  in height. They come from the planet Laxidazia, fourth from the sun in the Dolenz star system in the Milky Way galaxy.  The hedonistic Laxidazians imbibe an illegal alcoholic and mutagenic beverage which permanently transforms them into trolls. Pip the Troll is a Laxidazian. First seen in Strange Tales #179 (April 1975).

Lem
The Lem are a semi-serpentine race with red skin that averages  in height. They come from the planet Lemista, sixth from the sun in the Atianti star system in the Milky Way galaxy. Lem eat through special mouths in their chest. They have tails instead of legs, but can stand and traverse in a semi-upright position. Krugarr is a Lem. First seen in Shogun Warriors #19 (August 1980).

Levians
The Levians are a humanoid race with blue skin that otherwise looks very similar to Earth humans. Surviving Levians live aboard the "world-ship" Levianon. Their homeworld Levia was destroyed as they depleted the planet of magma and resources. First seen in Thor #256 (February 1977).

Lion-People
The Lion-People are a race of humanoid lions from the planet Ligra. They are often in conflict with the Dragon-Men.

Lithodia Rexians
The Lithodia Rexians are a race of giant rock monsters with Moai-like heads that come from the planet Lithodia Rex. One group of Lithodia Rex's sleeper agents was placed on Easter Island.

Ludberdites
The Ludberdites are a race of semi-humanoid fish aliens from the planet Zaar.

Lumina
The Lumina are a humanoid race that stands 5'5" in height on average, and appears just about identical to humans. They come from the planet Lumin, ninth from the sun in the Sh'Mengi star system in the Milky Way galaxy. They have average lifespans of thousands of years. They are members of the federation of alien races called the Charter (along with the Lem, Myndai, and Nanda). First seen in Shogun Warriors #1 (February 1979).

Lupak
The Lupak are one of the many alien species that are part of the Shi'ar Imperium, Immortal and next to invincible. They're capable of wielding cosmic energy for a number of effects; supposedly their god-like power stems from an invisible gland which sits in a separate dimension while gravitating near their bodies at all times. Enabling virtual reincarnation when cloned into another body. Fang of the Imperial Guard is a Lupak.

Luphomoids
The Luphomoids are a race of aliens. Nebula and Spirit are Luphomoids.

M
M'Hassians
The M'Hassians are an alien race from the planet M'Hass. First appeared in Thor (vol. 2) #22.

M'Ndavians
The M'Ndavians are a semi-humanoid race with yellow skin and oversized, diamond-shaped heads, averaging  in height. They possess highly advanced intellects. They live on the planet M'Ndavi, tenth from the sun in the B'lbwo star system in the Shi'ar galaxy. they have the most complex legal system in the known galaxies and are used by the Shi'ar for matters of great significance to the empire. A M'Ndavian served as the judge at the trial of Mister Fantastic (who was tried for saving the life of Galactus). First seen in Fantastic Four #262 (January 1984).

Majesdanians
First seen in Runaways #1, the Majesdanians are able to absorb and project solar energy. They are enemies of the Skrulls and are at war with them. Their homeworld is hidden under the guise of a white dwarf star and they have remained hidden from attack for years. Karolina Dean is a Majesdanian.

Makluans
The Makluans are a race of dragon-like reptilians with green to orange skin that average  in height when upright. They come from the planet Maklu-IV – also known as Kakaranathara – in the Maklu star system of the Greater Magellanic Cloud, in the Milky Way galaxy, and are also known as the Kakaranatharans. It is known to have a highly advanced and peaceful society. Fin Fang Foom is a Makluan. His race, or at least a small faction of it, invaded China more or less by accident when their spaceship crashed, but he was (eventually) put to sleep by narcotic herbs. First seen in Tales of Suspense #62 (February 1965) and then Strange Tales #89. In New Excalibur #12 it is revealed that Makluans invaded Camelot around the same time, and possibly other places as well. From Axonn-Karr of Maklu-4, another crew member of the ship Fin Fang Foom arrived on, the Mandarin was able to acquire his rings of power before setting up his base in the Valley of Spirits in China.

Mandos
The Mandos are a race of humanoids with green skin, averaging  in height. They come from the planet Mand, eight from the sun in the Tumbia star system in the Andromeda galaxy. Mando skin is capable of withstanding the vacuum of space, and Mandos are superhumanly strong. First seen in Warlock #15 (November 1976).

Mannequins
The Mannequins are an amoeba-like race with tentacles.

Martians
Earth-616 has the most varied amount of beings termed as "Martians" as any other reality in the Multiverse. Likely for the reasons cited above. However, many of these different races have yet to be classified. First appeared in Marvel Mystery Comics #3.

Marvanites
The Marvanites are a semi-humanoid race with oversized craniums and green skin, averaging 40' in height. They come from the planet Marvan, fifth from the sun in the Mawnolf star system. They have psionic abilities which allow them to overcome the pull of gravity on their huge bodies and levitate themselves; their psionics also allow them to project destructive force beams from their eyes and to self-teleport. First seen in Marvel Two-in-One Annual #3 (1978).

Megans
The Megans are a semi-reptilian, semi-humanoid race with one eye, red skin, oversized ears, and suction cups at the end of each digit. They live on the planet Mega, third from the sun, in the Mirpet star system in the Milky Way galaxy. The people of Mega were engaged in centuries in a war with the neighboring planet Beta. First seen in Godzilla #12 (July 1978).

Mekkans
The Mekkans are a race of semi-humanoid robots with superhuman strength. They come from the planet Mekka, second from the sun in the Kirthom star system in the Milky Way galaxy. Their planet was originally called Maarin, after the humanoids who lived there. They built the Mekkans as servants, but after the Maarin were all killed by an extraplanetary spore virus, the Mekkans took control of the planet. Torgo was from Mekka. First seen in Fantastic Four #91 (October 1969).

Mentelleronites
The Mentelleronites are a race of giant aliens. Orrgo is a Mentelleronite.

Mephitisoids
The Mephitisoids are a race of furry humanoids with a combination of originally skunk-like and later also cat-like characteristics, they have night vision, retractable claws, acute senses, pointed ears, and tails. They come from the planet Tryl'sart, third from the sun in the Cyrane Om'lr star system in the Shi'Ar galaxy. They communicate using pheromones. Hepzibah of the Starjammers is a Mephitisoid. Male Mephitisoids, who are extremely rare now, are capable of exuding pheromones that can subject almost any humanoid that breathes them in to their will. First seen in X-Men #107 (October 1977).

Mercurians
The Mercurians are a race of aliens descended from a race of genetically engineered humans who live on the planet Mercury. Nikki is from the planet Mercury. They first appeared in Marvel Presents #4 (April 1976).

Microns
The Microns are inhabitants of Ithaka in the Homeworld region from the sub-atomic universe. First seen in Micronauts #1.

Mobians
The Mobians are a humanoid race with orange skin and hair, averaging 8' in height. They come from the planet Mobius, eleventh from the sun in the Lemivell star system in the Andromeda Galaxy. they have the ability to survive for short periods in the vacuum of space. A Mobian named Xeron "the Star-Slayer" was a harpooner aboard the starship Andromeda when the ship encountered the Hulk. First seen in The Incredible Hulk (vol. 2) #136 (February 1971).

Morani
The Morani are a semi-humanoid race with green skin and hair, averaging  in height. Some Morani possess the ability to project bioelectric energy. Morani come from the planet Moran, fourth from the sun in the Jark star system in the Andromeda galaxy. A party of Morani once attacked one of the Watchers. First seen in Tales of Suspense #58 (October 1964).

Mummudrai
The Mummudrai, also called Revenants, are a psychic energy wraith like race of extra-dimensional origin. They represent the perfected anti-self of every being they're born alongside of in the universe, a malicious and evil species hailing from the darkest regions of the Astral Plane called Underworld. The mummudrai have the inherent ability to manipulate genetic and cellular matter at a near biomolecular level to fabricate bodies of their own or hideously degrading the biophysical structure of others. They jealously long to reach the physical plane and usurp their counterparts place in it, many having access to mental powers on top of all they're twins fullest potential on hand. First seen in New X-Men #125 (June 2002).

Myndai
The Myndai are a humanoid race which appears very similar to Earth humans. The Myndai were once members of the federation of alien races called the Charter (along with the Lem, Lumina, and Nanda). They were engaged in a galaxy-wide war with the Lumina, and some were placed on Earth in suspended animation eons ago as sleeper agents. First seen in Shogun Warriors #1 (February 1979).

N
Nanda
The Nanda are a semi-humanoid race with light green skin and large ovular heads, which average  in height. They come from the planet Nanda, second from the sun in the Particulus star system in the Milky Way galaxy. They are members of the federation of alien races called the Charter (along with the Lem, Lumina, and Myndai). First seen in Shogun Warriors #19 (August 1980).

Nicanthans
The Nicanthans are a race of humanoid hammerhead shark-like aliens that come from the planet Nicanthus Prime in the Negative Zone.

Nuwali
First seen in Ka-Zar the Savage #34, the Nuwali created the Savage Land for the Beyonders. They appear like hunched-over reptilians with massive, boxy trunks and short limbs.

Nymenians
The Nymenians are a humanoid hippopotamus-like race with light purple skin that averages  in height. Their home planet is Eomuma, fourth from the sun in the Myunimo star system in the Andromeda galaxy. The Nymenians live in tribal clans. First seen in Hercules #1 (September 1982).

O
Oobagonians
The Oobagonians are a race of aliens from Oobagon VIII. Their oversized faces resemble tiki masks of the Maori Tribe of Earth. In fact, at least one Oobagonian has been mistaken for wearing a mask when in fact he wasn't. First appeared in Journey Into Mystery #60.

Outriders
The Outriders are a race of genetically engineered humanoid creatures with the purpose of serving their maker Thanos and the Black Order until they die. First seen in Free Comic Book Day Infinity (May 2013).

Outriders in other media
The Outriders have appeared in the Marvel Cinematic Universe live-action films Avengers: Infinity War and Avengers: Endgame.

Ovoids
They come from the planet Birkeel, third from the sun in the Janstak star system in the Milky Way galaxy. They are capable of levitating objects psionically, and are capable of mind transfer. When they are about to die, they transfer their minds into apparently inanimate bodies that have been prepared for them. The Ovoids once rescued Doctor Doom, and were responsible for teaching him the mind transfer technique. He claims they were so advanced they trusted every other living thing. The Ovoids were also responsible for the death of the original Air-Walker. First seen in Fantastic Four #10 (January 1963).

P
Pangorians
The Pangorians are a race of alien pirates from the planet Pangoria.

Pegasusians
The Pegasusians are reptilian race with light green skin that average  in height. They live on the planet Lar, fifth from the sun in the Stinlar (anagram of Jim Starlin's surname) star system in the Milky Way galaxy. Pegasusians can psionically project anti-gravitons to support their large mass in high gravities. A Pegasusian named Sphinxor was contracted by the Beyonders to tow Counter-Earth to their museum. First seen in Strange Tales #178 (February 1975).

Pheragots
The Pheragots are a semi-humanoid race with light blue skin that averages  in height. They come from the planet Arago-7 in the Arago star system in the Andromeda galaxy. They have extraordinary superhuman strength due in part to their dense molecular structure. They are also an extremely peaceful, inoffensive race. First seen in Hercules #1 (September 1982).

Plodex
The Plodex are an entirely non-humanoid race and are shapeless blobs in their natural form. They are able to adapt to forms capable of creating and manipulating advanced technology, which in turn can study, alternate and improve genetic material to augment themselves or others with. Marrina of Alpha Flight is a member of the Plodex race. First seen in Alpha Flight #1 (August 1983).

Pluvians
The Pluvians are a race of aliens descended from a race of genetically engineered humans who live on the planet Pluto. Martinex is a Pluvian. First appeared in Sub-Mariner Comics #38.

Poisons
First seen in Venomverse #1, the Poisons are a race of aliens that hails from a Universe overrun by Symbiotes. In their true form the Poisons are small, with crystalline armor and spikes and are physically frail with the exception of their Queen which is massive. They possess psionic abilities to some degree which acts as a defense mechanism that allows them to disguise themselves and create illusions. They are also revealed to be symbiotic in nature and whenever they bond with a symbiote and its respective host, they become exponentially stronger by forming a permanent bond with it. The symbiote and its host will cease to exist as individuals as the Poison will assimilate the host's memories, powers and abilities. They are even considered nature's answer to the Symbiotes. Once they assimilate a symbiote, they are unable to consume anyone else, leaving them vulnerable to being killed. They became a threat to the entire Multiverse after they discovered the existence of other realities, but are now considered extinct, with only one member alive.

Poppupians
The Poppupians are a semi-humanoid race with light green skin that is able to assume virtually any form within a certain range of mass. Poppupians can also levitate and traverse interstellar space without starships, and they reproduce asexually by massive cell division. Galactus destroyed their home planet of Poppup. The Impossible Man is a Poppupian. First seen in Fantastic Four #11 (February 1963).

Procyonites
The Procyonites are a reptilian race with a large brown tortoise-like shell and brown scales,  in height on average. They come from the planet Perratin, second from the sun in the Procyon star system in the Milky Way galaxy. A Procyonite named Tork was among the minions of Korvac in the 30th Century. First seen in Thor Annual #6 (1977).

Progenitors
First mentioned in Royals #6 and full seen in Royals #10, the Progenitors are an ancient but still mysterious giant god-like cybernetic race. The most distinct feature of this race is that they have floating heads. They isolated themselves from the rest of the galaxy and live in a controlled planetary system called the World Farm at the far end of the universe where they carry out their experiments. There are different kinds of Progenitors, with which one having a different task to perform. They appear to have a hive-mind and are guided by the Overlord-Class Progenitor. The Progenitors are revealed to be the creators of the Kree by mutating them with Primagen to their current evolutionary state, but were deemed as failures since their evolution stopped before they could become useful for the Progenitors. When the Progenitors took notice of the Inhumans, they invented the Skyspears, diagnostic tools flung from the World Farm towards Inhuman population centers with the objective to study them. It was later revealed that the World Farm was reached at some point by a clone of Nathaniel Essex who left planet Earth before space travel was so much an idea entertained by human fiction. Created to explore the stars, this clone eventually managed to take over the World Farm and the Progenitors, whom he was able to easely reprogram to serve his goals.

Prosilicans
First seen in Tales of Suspense #53, the Prosilicans are a race who inspired the Watchers' oath of non-interference. It all started when they destroyed themselves in a nuclear war on the planet Prosilicus after having been given the secret of atomic energy by the Watchers' well-meaning ancestors. The surviving Prosilicans later relocated to the planet Partha with a cover-up that their planet was destroyed by a rogue asteroid.

Q
Queega
Their home planet is Queeg, fourth from the sun in the Quolan star system in the Andromeda galaxy. They can generate electrical energy around their heads, and they breathe and speak through small orifices in their foreheads. They can project intense waves of coldness from their foreheads. A band of Queega once used a "sight-stealing ray" to attempt to blind all of Earth's humans. First seen in Daredevil #28 (May 1967).

Quist
Their home planet is Quistalium, second from the sun in the Quistraa star system in the Milky Way galaxy. Lucifer is a Quist and Dominus was created by Quists. First seen in Tales of Suspense #56 and X-Men #20 (May 1966).

Quo Modari
They are a pacifist race that was dedicated to the arts of diplomacy and the inter-species community. First seen in Force Works #13.

Quons
They come from the planet Quon, third from the sun in the Byjak star system in the Milky Way galaxy. They are amphibious, possessing both lungs and gills. They are superhumanly strong, to survive both great water pressure and their planet's gravity. First seen in Fantastic Four #97 (April 1970).

Quwrlln
First seen in Alpha Flight #25, the Quwrlln are a very-old alien species that learned about the threat of Galactus.

R
R'malk'i
The R'malk'i are a race of plant creatures. They resemble trees with humanoid arms, and average  in height. They live on the planet R'makl'z in the C'lehr'ee star system in the Milky Way galaxy. They communicate telepathically and are mobile but must take root in their native soil when asleep. First seen in Warlock #15 (November 1976).

R'zahnians
The R'zahnians are a humanoid race with red skin. They come from the planet R'zahn, second from the sun in the Lahj'kk star system in the Milky Way galaxy. They have a planetwide monarchy. A R'zahnian named Zamu was sent as an advance scout to infiltrate Earth, but he was defeated by Doctor Druid. First seen in Weird Wonder Tales #20 (January 1977).

Rajaks
Their home planet is Rajak, fifth from the sun in the Jakkel star system. Their society consists of confederacies of large space piracy organizations, which wipe out all life on a planet with their "delta-ray" cannon, in order to plunder them of valuable elements. Many Rajaki were destroyed by Ultimo when he razed their planet. Sapper, partner to Goldenblade, is a cybernetically converted Rajak. First seen in Tales of Suspense #57 (September 1964).

Rajaks in other media
The Rajaks appear in the Marvel Cinematic Universe television series Agents of S.H.I.E.L.D.. The Rajaks are part of the Confederacy. Magei (portrayed by E.R. Ruiz) served as an ambassador to the Confederacy as seen in "The One Who Will Save Us All".

Recluses
The Recluses are an alien race that sued the Watchers for the right of seclusion and privacy.

Recorders
The Recorders are a race of robotic life-forms created by the Rigellians. The Recorders are generally used as scouts to explore new territory and report back to the Rigellians. Recorders are occasionally seen assisting various cosmic entities – for instance, one of them once lived at Uatu the Watcher's home-place at the Blue Area of the Earth's Moon and observed the apparent death of Jean Grey as Phoenix. Another Recorder, RT-Z9, works for the Living Tribunal's Magistrati, more specifically She-Hulk. Recorder 451 helped Howard Stark and Maria Stark bring Arno Stark to life.

Recorders in other media
Recorder 3B02, also referred to as "Cora," plays a central role in the Marvel's Wastelanders series of podcasts.

Reptoids
Their home planet is Tayp, second from the sun in the Kormuk star system in the Milky Way galaxy. A Reptoid named Teju served as a minion of Korvac in the 30th Century. First seen in Thor Annual #6 (1977).

Rhunians
They come from the planet Rhun, in the Vulliger star system. They are capable of deriving energy through destroying stars and other planets. First seen in Thor #219 (January 1974).

Rigellians
The Rigellians, also known as the Colonizers of Rigel, are a scientifically and technologically advanced alien race devoted towards amassing an empire via colonization. Tana Nile and Mentacle Rigellian.

Rigellians in other media
The Rigellians appear in the Guardians of the Galaxy TV series and are mentioned in the Marvel's Wastelanders podcast series.

Roclites
They come from the planet Rocklon, fifth from the sun in the Tarl star system in the Milky Way galaxy. The Blood Brothers are Roclites. First seen in Iron Man #55 (February 1973).

Ruul
The Ruul are actually an evolved form of Kree. First seen in Maximum Security: Dangerous Planet #1.

S
Sagittarians
The  Sagittarians are a humanoid race with grey skin, standing  on average, Male Saggitarians have fins atop their heads. They originate from the planet Berhert, third from the sun in the Rempit star system in the Milky Way galaxy. First seen in The Incredible Hulk (vol. 2) #111 (January 1969).

Sakaarans
The Sakaarans  are a race of humanoid aliens from the planet Sakaar that are split into different groups. First appeared in Incredible Hulk (vol. 2) #92.

 The Sakaaran Imperials are red to pink-skinned humanoids and are the dominant culture on Sakaar where they are the ruling class. Elloe Kaifi and Red King are Sakaaran Imperials.
 The Shadow People are sandy-brown or orange-tan to gray-skinned humanoids that dwell on many planets where most of them reside on Sakaar. They were responsible for the creation of the Old Power which is an artificial version of the Power Cosmic. Hiroim and Caiera, as well as Hulk's twin sons Hiro-Kala and Skaar (from their mother Caiera) are Shadow People.
 The Sakaaran Natives are short insectoids that live in the harsh deserts of Sakaar. Miek is a Sakaaran Native.

Sakaarans in other media
 The Sakaarans appear in Guardians of the Galaxy.
 The Sakaarans appear in the animated film Planet Hulk.
 The Sakaarans appear in the Marvel Cinematic Universe live-action films Guardians of the Galaxy and Thor: Ragnarok.

Sarks
The Sarks are a humanoid race with light blue skin, standing  on average. They come from the planet Sarka, third from the sun in the Tilnast star system in the Milky Way galaxy. Sarks were among the highest officials in the Universal Church of Truth. Captain Autolycus is a Sark. First seen in Strange Tales #179 (April 1975).

Saurids
The Saurids are a race of amphibious reptilians with both lungs and gills, Saurids have green scaled skin with yellow fins. Their home planet is Timor, fourth from the sun in the Varanus star system, in the Shi'ar galaxy. Ch'od of the Starjammers is a Saurid. First seen in X-Men #107 (October 1977). The Abomination and Teen Abomination, both of whom were Hulk's enemies along with his teenage ally and now friend he saved earlier from an explosion during the detonation of an experimental bomb, Rick Jones a.k.a. A-Bomb, were mistaken for this race due to their appearances but were actually humans mutated through overexposure to gamma rays.

Scatter
First seen in Force Works #1, the Scatter are an insect-like hive minds inhabiting humanoid shells.

Scy'ar Tal
Once known as the M'Kraan, the Scy'ar Tal are a humanoid species with insect-like traits, such as a hive-like mind and both an endoskeleton and a thick, black exoskeletons. The Scy'ar Tal are a patriarchal society where individuality is otherwise nonexistent. All members of the species appears to be identical. They have ridged heads and prominent cheek plates and are seemingly exclusively male. The exception is their leader, "the Eldest", who is the only distinguishable being since his position allows for such honor. The Eldest is select seemingly at random through an undefined process involving the sharing of his people lifeforces which grants him vast strength, near invulnerability, an enhanced physique and energy projection abilities. If "the Eldest" is slain, another is immediately selected. They were believable to be the original inheritors of the M’Kraan Crystal, until they were almost decimated by the Shi'ar who claimed and coopted the M'Kraan Crystal's power for themselves. The surviving members flee to other space and dedicated themselves to developing their technology and reshaping their society with the sole purpose of destroying the Shi’ar. Changing their name that literally means "Death to the Shi'ar", they became a strong and aggressive species, with the ability to communicate and interact with each other telepathically, and with the ability to produce a blue flame like energy blast. As a side note it was revealed that they too arrived on the planet where the M'kraan Crystal is located and conquered the alien race living there. First appeared in X-Men: Emperor Vulcan #1 (September 2007).

Sentimault
The Sentimault are a race of aliens in robotic bodies whose home planet was destroyed by the Builders. Their robotic bodies protect them from the hostile environments.

Sidri

First seen in X-Men #154 (February 1982), the Sidri are aliens that look like either giant beetles, crabs, or stingrays.

Sirians
The Sirians are a humanoid race appearing identical to Earth humans and are ruled by a dictatorship. They inhabit both their home planet of Sirius III and a colony on Sirius IV in the Sirius star system in the Milky Way galaxy. The Sirians were conquered by the Quists, and a Sirian named Ixar came to Earth with the intent of conquest using his giant androids called Ultroids, but was repulsed by the Avengers. First seen in The Avengers #36 (January 1967) and X-Men #21 (June 1966).

Siris
The Siris are a semi-octopus race with ten fingered tentacles and light green skin, averaging 6' in height (not including the tentacles). They come from the planet Yormot, second from the sun in the Sirius star system in the Milky Way galaxy. The Mutant Master was a Siris. First seen in X-Men #37 (October 1967) (disguised as humanoid) and X-Men #39 (true form revealed).

Sirusites
The Sirusites are a humanoid race that appears virtually indistinguishable from Earth humans. They live on the planet Sirus X, in the Al'Ma'an star system in the Milky Way galaxy. Sirus X is the Holy Planet of the galaxy-wide Universal Church of Truth theocratic empire. First seen in Strange Tales #179 (April 1975).

Skrullduggers
The Skrullduggers are shapeshifting dragon-like creatures that came from the Skrull homeworld. When they arrived on Weirdworld, they became an invasive species and have been on Weirdworld long before a group from Roxxon Energy Corporation arrived. The magic of Witch Queen le Fay has kept them in line. First seen in Weapon H #6.

Sleepwalkers
The Sleepwalkers are a race of beings that patrols the Mindscape, a parallel dimension that connects the minds of all living beings, to protect those minds from the invasions of monsters and demons. Physically, they resemble gaunt humanoids with long limbs, olive-green skin, and red compound eyes. One of these entities became trapped in the mind of university student Rick Sheridan, and gained the ability to manifest on Earth whenever Rick slept, becoming a superhero. First seen in Sleepwalker #1.

Sligs
The Sligs are a race of brown insectoid non-humanoids with eight tentacle-like limbs, the front limbs of which can be used for grasping and manipulating objects. Sligs have telepathic powers, and can levitate themselves. They come from the planet Ankara, sixth from the sun in the Ryneb star system in the Milky Way galaxy. First seen in Fantastic Four #209 (August 1979).

Sloggs
The Sloggs are a race of humanoid slugs from the planet Sloggo-Prime. They are chronally-challenged.

Sm'ggani
They have suction disks on their fingers and feet and superhuman strength; some can alter the density of part or all of their bodies so that they can pass through other solid objects. They come from the planet M'ggani, fifth from the sun in the T'letio star system in the Milky Way galaxy. First seen in The Incredible Hulk (vol. 2) #230 (December 1978).

Snarfs
The Snarfs are a reptilian race.

Sneepers
They come from the planet Sneep, fourth from the sun in the Snuup star system in the Milky Way galaxy. The Sneepers have built a small interplanetary empire and intend to rule the entire galaxy someday. First seen in Tales of Suspense #49 (January 1964).

Solons
The Solons are a race of humanoids with blue skin that averages 9' in height. Their home planet is Solon, fourth from the sun in the Nardea star system in the Milky Way galaxy. They are a race of purpose-bred clones with psionic powers. A Solon named Spinnerette encountered the Fantastic Four. First seen in Fantastic Four #237 (December 1981).

Soul-Eaters
The Soul-Eaters, also called Souleaters or Soul Eaters, are creatures that are native to the Sixth Dimension. A tribe of them had fled their realm and infested the spirit of a young boy on Manhattan's Upper West Side. The parents of the boy sought for help to Doctor Strange, who traveled to the boy's very soulscape and tried to make the creatures go away.

Space Phantoms

The Space Phantoms are the servants of Immortus, the Master of Time. For many years, it was assumed that there was only one Space Phantom, but in the course of the Destiny War the Avengers discovered that there was more than one. During a journey back in time to 1873, a trio of Space Phantoms was caught impersonating the Gunhawks and the Black Rider. The Space Phantoms were previously said to have originated on the planet Phantus, in the Phalbo system in the Milky Way Galaxy.

Spartoi
The Spartoi, also called Spartaxians, are the human-like species from the planet Spartax. Star-Lord, J'son, and Victoria are known Spartoi. First seen in Marvel Preview #4.

Spartoi in other media
The Spartoi appear in Guardians of the Galaxy.

Sssth
They come from the planet Sszardil, second from the sun in the Sslirteep star system in the Milky Way galaxy. First seen in Thor #212 (June 1973).

Starsharks
The Starsharks, also called Star Sharks or Space Sharks, are shark-like creatures that live in space. They are known to be present at least in the Pegasus System. They vary greatly in size, reaching up to lengths ranging in the hundreds of feet and while most individuals seen seem to have a Great White Shark appearance, there are others that look like Hammerhead sharks Starsharks are highly maneuverable and travel at high velocity in space, though they lack the natural ability to travel faster-than-light. They are usually hunted and enslaved by the Brood to become their living vessels. Those captured undergo technological modification for advance propulsion to increase their offensive capabilities. Because of their ruthlessness, it is known the God Tempest is coming when even the Starsharks flee in terror, but already too late to avoid it.

Star-Headed Old Ones
The Star-Headed Old Ones are a winged race of the Old Ones who came to Earth where they built a city which came to be known as the Mountain of Madness. First seen in Conan the Savage #4 (November 1995).

Stenth
The Stenth are a semi-humanoid race with yellow skin that stands  on average. They come from the planet Stent, fifth from the sun in the Duggil star system in the Milky Way galaxy. First seen in Inhumans #7 (October 1976).

Stonians
Stonians inhabit the planets Stonus I through Stonus V in the Stonus star system in the Milky Way galaxy. Gorgolla is a Stonian. First seen in Astonishing Tales #21 (December 1973).

Strontians
The Strontians are humanoid purple-skinned aliens that are part of the Shi'ar Empire ever since Majestor T'Korr brought them the cure to the Wraith Plague that ravaged their planet. Gladiator of the Shi'ar Imperial Guard is a Strontian. First seen in X-Men #107.

Stygians
The Stygians are a race of semi-humanoids that are part of the Shi'ar Empire. Neutron is a Stygian.

T
Taa-ans
The Taa-ans are a race of humanoids from the planet Taa, a planet that existed in the universe prior to the setting of primary Marvel continuity. Galan is originally a Taa-an before he becomes the cosmic entity Galactus.

Talbosians
The Talbosians are a race of wolf-like aliens from the planet Talbos.

Taurians
The Taurians are a semi-humanoid race with orange skin that averages  in height. Their home planet of Taur in the Jenzen star system in the Milky Way galaxy was destroyed by Galactus. A few Taurians escaped and now live aboard starships with other aliens who lost their planets to Galactus called The Wanderers. A Taurian named Kehl served Nebula. First seen in Thor #160 (January 1969).

Technarchy
The Technarchy, or Technarch, are a cybernetic, shape shifting alien species. Its most notable members are the New Mutants member Warlock and Magus. They are a race of giant techno-organic entities with very aggressive natures. They were created by the Phalanx, however due to their aggressive nature, they truly believe to be the progenitors of the Phalanx, and even consider them abominations of their race, unaware that their origins lie in fact with the Phalanx. They travel the universe looking for things on which to feed, which can be organic or mechanical. They feed by infecting their prey with the Transmode Virus, converting it into techno-organic matter, from which they then drain the energy.

Tektons
The Tektons are a semi-humanoid race covered with purple fur, averaging  in height. They come from the planet Tekton, ninth from the sun in the Tacuspar star system in the Andromeda galaxy. These savage primitives have superhuman strength and prehensile tails. First seen in Fantastic Four #91 (October 1969).

Teuthidans
The Teuthidans are a race of one-eyed squid-like aliens from the planet Teuthida.

Teuthidans in other media
The Teuthidans appear in Lego Marvel Super Heroes 2.

Thuvrians
The Thuvrians are a race of humanoids with oversized heads, averaging  in height. Their home planet is Thuvria, third from the sun in the Lomyra star system in the Milky Way galaxy. As of 200 years ago, their development was arrested at a level comparable to the European Middle Ages. First seen in Rom the Spaceknight #19 (June 1981).

Tribbitites
They originated on the planet Kroke, but built on the artificial world of Tribbit (or "Toadworld") from stolen Kree plans to use as the capital of the Tribbitite Empire. A Tribbitite has a long sticky tongue which can be extended, like an Earth toad's. They have advanced technology stolen from other races, and specialize in powerful magnetic technology, which can even move the moon. First seen in Incredible Hulk #2 (July 1962). They kidnap Bruce Banner to learn how advanced Earth is, but he uses a gamma ray device to disrupt their fleet which is flung out into space.

Tribbitites in other media
The Tribbitites appear in the Hulk and the Agents of S.M.A.S.H. episode "Monsters No More". They are seen attacking Earth only to be repelled by the Agents of S.M.A.S.H. and the Fantastic Four.

Tribunals
The Tribunals are beings of sentient energy that can take on whatever physical form they desire. They possess untold psionic energy-manipulative abilities, and are even capable of moving objects through time. The Tribunals once summoned the original Defenders before them in order to persuade them to permanently disband. First seen in The Defenders #124 (October 1983).

Troyjans
The Troyjans are a race of warlords who conquered galaxies. Arm'Cheddon is a Troyjan who commands the squadron of conquerors. First seen in Incredible Hulk (vol. 2) #413 (January 1994).

Tsiln
The Tsiln are a race of semi-reptilian anthropoids with both reptilian and mammalian characteristics (reminiscent of cynodonts), with orange to gray scaled skin, and average 300' in height. They come from the planet Broi, second from the sun in the Wyllys star system in the Milky Way galaxy. Gog is a Tsiln. First seen in The Amazing Spider-Man #103 (December 1971).

Tsyrani
The Tsyrani are a humanoid race with six fingers on each hand and six toes on each foot. They come from the planet Tsorcherhi, third from the sun in the Ella star system in the Shi'ar galaxy. They are ruled by a matriarchal monarchy under supervision of the Shi'ar Empire. First seen in Spider-Woman #36 (March 1981).

U
Ul'lula'ns
The Ul'lula'ns are a race of shapeshifting race with powerful mental abilities, their natural form resembles a giant tentacled fish. Their home planet is Ul'lula, second from the sun in the Ul star system in the Milky Way galaxy. Nebulon and Supernalia are Ul'lula'ns. First seen in The Defenders #13 (May 1974).

Uncreated
The Uncreated, once called "the Works", are warlike and seek the extermination of all religions and religious species. Slightly larger and stronger than humans, they have claws and are covered with quills. Uncreated are capable of communicating with humans, but it is unclear whether this is through speech or some form of telepathy. The Uncreated claim that they did not evolve naturally, but were instead created by a powerful creature which they worshipped as a god.

Uranusians
The Uranusians are a race of wooden aliens.

Ursaa
The Ursaa are a race of scavenger aliens. They would scavenge any downed spaceships and sell any survivors they find to the Chnitt.

V
Va-Shaak
The Va-Shaak are a race of alien invaders that are also known as the Horde.

Vegans
Vegans continually radiate anti-gravitons from areas of their brains contained within two horn-like projections on the front of their skulls in order to support their vast bulk. Their home planet is Vega Superior, fourth from the sun in the Vega star system in the Milky Way galaxy. A Vegan named Agent 7M, the Colossus, attempted to conquer Earth but was thwarted by Giant-Man. First seen in Tales to Astonish #58 (August 1964).

Viscardi
The Viscardi are a race of aliens that live on the planet of the same name.

Voldi
The Voldi are a race of humanoids descended from birds that have feathers instead of hair.

Vorms
The Vorms are a reptilian race with red scaled skin that averages  in height. Their home planet is Vormir, sixth from the sun in the Helgentar star system in the Kree galaxy (Greater Magellanic Cloud). Each Vorm has a long tail that can be used as a weapon. Vorms are nocturnal and are vulnerable to great heat. The Star-Stalker, a Vorm mutant, possessed powers that other Vorms lack, such as the ability to fly through space and drain energy. First seen in The Avengers #123 (May 1974).

Vrellnexians
The Vrellnexians are an insectoid race that usually has purple skin, and stands  on average. They come from the planet Vrellnex, fifth from the sun in the Cetsin star system in the Milky Way galaxy. They stand on their hindmost pair of limbs, and have two sets of arms. They differ widely in appearance; some are winged and can fly. First seen in Thor #212 (June 1973).

Vrellnexians in other media
The Vrellnexians appear in season five of the Marvel Cinematic Universe television series Agents of S.H.I.E.L.D.. This version of the Vrellnexians are four-legged and operate in packs. In an alternate future, the Vrellnexians roam the abandoned parts of the Lighthouse and the only inhabitable parts of what's left of Earth.

W
Wilameanis
The Wilameanis are a humanoid race that appears very similarly to Earth humans, averaging  in height. They come from the planet Wilamean, fifth from the sun in the Yalnot star system in the Andromeda galaxy. In the 22nd Century, Wilameanis dun Starharbor, a popular spaceport. First seen in Hercules #2 (October 1982).

Wobbs
The Wobbs are a semi-humanoid race that possess telepathic abilities enabling them to understand any auditory language and translate it telepathically to other nearby sentient organisms. Their homeworld is Wobb-Lar, second from the sun in the Filipima star system in the Andromeda galaxy. First seen in Incredible Hulk (vol. 2) #137 (March 1971).

Wobbow
The Wobbow are a race of dangerous green aliens from the planet Draconius.

X
Xandarians
First seen in Nova #1, the Xandarians are a human-like species surviving on four conjoined asteroids, the only remains of their homeworld Xandar. They are founders of the Nova Corps.

Xandarians in other media
The Xandarians and Nova Corps appear in the Marvel Cinematic Universe live-action films Guardians of the Galaxy and Guardians of the Galaxy Vol. 2, mentioned to have been "decimated" by Thanos in Avengers: Infinity War.

Xantareans
The Xantareans are a reptilian humanoid race with red scaled skin that stands  on average. They are amphibious. Their home planet is Xantar, second from the sun in the Xantares star system in the Milky Way galaxy. First seen in Tales to Astonish #73 (November 1965).

Xantha
The Xantha are a semi-humanoid race with pale yellow skin that stands  on average. They originate from the planet Xanth (aka Planet X) which was destroyed in a collision with a rogue asteroid. With the help of Mister Fantastic, the survivors established a new home planet of New Xanth, first from the sun in the New Jatskan star system in the Milky Way galaxy. Kurrgo is a Xantha. First seen in Fantastic Four #7 (October 1962).

Xantha in other media
The Xantha appear in the Fantastic Four episode "Prisoners of Planet X".

Xartans
The Xartans are a race of Shapeshifting species capable of detailed duplication of living or non-living subjects. They come from the planet Xarta, fourth from the sun in the Zugano star system in the Fornax galaxy. In their true forms, Xartans have orange skin and average  in height. First seen (as the Carbon-Copy Men) in Journey into Mystery #90 (March 1963).

Xem
The Xem are a furry white alien race. Xemnu is a Xem.

Xeronians
The Xeronians are a semi-humanoid race with orange skin that averages  in height. They come from the planet Xeron, second from the sun in the triple star system containing Aerim, Honj, and Verserin, in the Milky Way galaxy. Xeronians have five eyes, but use only two adjacent eyes at the same time. First seen in The Incredible Hulk (vol. 2) #102 (May 1968).

Xixix
The Xixix are a semi-humanoid race with red skin that averages  in height. They come from the planet Xix, which was in the Xaravaran stary system in the Milky Way galaxy until destroyed by Galactus. The Xixix survivors joined the wandering fleet of starships bearing many members of the many alien races whose home worlds were destroyed by Galactus. First seen in Fantastic Four #261 (December 1983).

Xorrians
The Xorrians are a humanoid race that allegedly spawned all humanoid life such as Kree, Skrulls, Shi'ar and Humans over 6,000,000 years ago.

Y
Yirbek
The Yirbek are a race of humanoid reptilians with green skin that averages  in height. Their home planet is Yirb, second from the sun in the Bek star system in the Andromeda galaxy. The Yirbeks governed a small empire in the Skrull galaxy until the Skrulls defeated them centuries ago. First seen in Avengers #14 (March 1965).

Yrds
The Yrds are a semi-humanoid race with green skin that stands  on average. They come from the planet Yrest, third from the sun in the Corinum star system in the Draco galaxy. Each Yrd has a 1' long horn protruding from its forehead that could be used as a weapon. First seen in Tales of Suspense #54 (June 1964).

Z
Z'Nox
The Z'Nox are a race of reptilians with brown skin that averages  in height. They come from the planet Z'nox, second from the sun in the Huz'deyr star system in the Andromeda galaxy. They are ruled by a planetwide military dictatorship. They once attacked Earth, but were repelled by the X-Men; a later attack via biological warfare was repelled by Spider-Man during the Maximum Security storyline. First seen in X-Men #65 (February 1970).

Zen-Whoberis
The Zen-Whoberis are a race of green-skinned humanoids from the planet Zen-Whoberi that are also called the Zen-Whoberians. Gamora is a Zenn-Whoberis.

Zenn-Lavians
The Zenn-Lavians are human-like species, later described as a pacifist offshoot of the Kree. Their planet Zenn-La is third from the sun in the Deneb star system in the Milky Way galaxy. Silver Surfer and Shalla-Bal are Zenn-Lavians. First seen in Silver Surfer #1 (August 1968).

Zn'rx
The Zn'rx are a bipedal reptilian race with a digitigrade leg structure. They are intelligent and have interstellar travel technology. However, they are also a warlike race by tradition.

Zundamites
Their home planet is Zundam. They have the ability to survive in virtually any environment without a special apparatus. A Zundamite served as herald to Terminus.

References

 Official Handbook of the Marvel Universe: Deluxe Edition'' #15: "Wonder Man to Zzzax plus Appendix to Alien races" (March 1987)

External links
 Alien Races at MarvelDirectory.com
 Races at marvunapp.com
 Marvel's Alien Races at ComicBoards.com
 

Extraterrestrial species and races by work
Lists of fictional alien species
Alien races